Bujagali may refer to:

 Bujagali Falls, waterfalls on the Victoria Nile that were submerged in 2011 when Bujagali Power Station was built
 Bujagali Hydroelectric Power Station, 250 megawatt hydro power plant, the largest power station in Uganda between 2012 and 2018
 Bujagali Energy Limited, Special Purpose Vehicle company that owns and operates Bujagali Power Station